Faisalabad–Jaranwala Road (Punjabi), also known locally as Jaranwala Road is a provincially maintained road in Punjab that extends from Faisalabad to Jaranwala.

Nowadays in 2020 Road is in very bad condition for driving.

Salient features
Length: 36 km

Lanes: 4 lanes

Speed limit: Universal minimum speed limit of 60 km/h and a maximum speed limit of 80 km/h for heavy transport vehicles and 100 km/h for light transport vehicles.

Main Bus stops
Dhudiwala
Makuana
Muhammad Wala
Sain Di Khui
109 Phatak
Awagat

References

Roads in Punjab, Pakistan
Transport in Faisalabad District
Streets in Faisalabad